The Claude Watson School for the Arts (CWSA) is a public arts school for grades 4-8 in Toronto, Ontario, Canada.

History 
The Claude Watson School for the Arts was founded in 1981 after the North York Board of Education proposed a school with a program for artistically gifted individuals in February 1980. Neil P. Johnston was the school's first principal. When the CWSA was opened, it had a capacity of 175 students. 

In 1998, a proposition by Bramalea Ltd. to redevelop the CWSA Spring Garden campus into high-rises with a school in their midst was rejected by the school's trustees. In 2003, the Toronto District School Board sold approximately half of the school's 1.6 hectare campus to private buyers with the intention of utilizing the funds for improvements to the school. 

In October 2017, the Toronto District School Board proposed ending specialty schools in Toronto, including the Claude Watson School for the Arts. The motion was retracted within a month of the initial proposal.

Admissions 
The Claude Watson School for the Arts uses an audition process to select its students.

Academics 
Students at the Claude Watson School for the Arts spend half of their day learning traditional school subjects and the other half participating in specialized arts learning. CWSA offers arts programming in four subject areas: music, dance, drama and visual arts. The dance department at CWSA was founded by Maxine Heppner. CWSA uses an extended school day to allow for specialized arts training while meeting provincial curriculum requirements.

As of 2006, CWSA has a maximum of 300 students.

Architecture

Spring Garden location 
The former campus of the Claude Watson School for the Arts was located northeast of Yonge Street and Sheppard Avenue on Spring Garden Avenue.

Doris Avenue location 
The current campus of the Claude Watson School for the Arts is located at 130 Doris Avenue in Toronto's northern precinct. The Doris Avenue CWSA building was completed in 2007 and designed by Kohn Shnier Architects. The building has a cantilevered library that sits overtop an outdoor amphitheatre and a brise-soleil with hexagonal patterning. The Doris Avenue camps has LEED Silver certification.

Claude Watson Secondary Arts Program 
The Claude Watson School for the Arts is affiliated with the Claude Watson Secondary Arts Program for high school students run out of the Earl Haig Secondary School. Students graduating from CWSA are not guaranteed entry into the Secondary Arts Program and must audition.

Notable alumni 

 Ariel Garten, artist and scientist
Sarah Gadon, actress
 Scott Helman, singer-songwriter
Tommy Paxton-Beesly, songwriter and musician who performs as River Tiber
Rachel Skarsten, actress

References 

Schools in the TDSB
Educational institutions established in 1981
1981 establishments in Ontario
Art schools in Canada